Talk to Me Baby is an album by trumpeter Warren Vaché which was recorded in 1995 and released on the Muse label the following year.

Reception

The AllMusic review by Scott Yanow stated "This Warren Vache CD is a bit unusual, for it features the trumpeter, best known for his work in the mainstream and small-group swing field, playing quite a few selections that fall stylistically into bop and hard bop ... No matter how complex the piece, Vache plays throughout in prime form, showing that he could be one of the top latter-day beboppers if that were his main goal".

Track listing
 "On Y Va (Off We Go)" (Warren Vaché) – 4:14
 "The Arrival" (Horace Parlan) – 6:36
 "You'll Never Know" (Harry Warren, Mack Gordon) – 4:46
 "The Eels Nephew" (Bud Freeman) – 4:16
 "Stranger in Paradise" (George Forrest, Robert Wright) – 5:52
 "Polka Dots and Moonbeams" (Jimmy Van Heusen, Johnny Burke) – 4:51
 "Says You" (Sam Jones) – 5:34
 "Talk to Me Baby" (Robert Dolan, Johnny Mercer) – 4:59
 "Isfahan" (Billy Strayhorn) – 5:00
 "Pick Yourself Up" (Jerome Kern, Dorothy Fields) – 3:48
 "The Claw" (Flip Phillips) – 6:33

Personnel
Warren Vaché – trumpet
Bill Easley – saxophone 
Howard Alden – guitar
Joel Helleny – trombone 
Richard Wyands – piano 
Michael Moore – bass
Alvin Queen – drums

References

Muse Records albums
Warren Vaché Jr. albums
1995 albums
Albums recorded at Van Gelder Studio